Gary Holt may refer to:

Gary Holt (footballer) (born 1973), Scottish former footballer and now football coach
Gary Holt (musician) (born 1964), American guitarist
Gary Holt (ice hockey) (born 1952), former Canadian professional ice hockey forward